South Africa competed in the 2003 All-Africa Games held at the National Stadium in the city of Abuja, Nigeria.

Competitors
South Africa entered 149 events at the games. Of these, 126 were for men and 91 for women.

Medal summary

South Africa won 171 medals, of which 63 were gold, 59 silver and 59 bronze.

Medal table

References

2003 in South African sport
2003
Nations at the 2003 All-Africa Games